Mozaic were a British group, active in the mid-1990s.

Discography

Singles

References

Black British musical groups
British contemporary R&B musical groups
British R&B girl groups
English girl groups
English vocal groups